Wave dash (Unicode U+301C) is a fullwidth character represented in Japanese character encoding, usually used to represent a range.

Vertical wave dash also exists, but is not encoded in Unicode.
Wave dash is also written in vertical text layout. Vertical wave dash is the vertical form by rotation and flip in Unicode and JIS C 6226.

See also 

 Dash#Swung dash
 Tilde#Unicode and Shift JIS encoding of wave dash
 Japanese punctuation#Wave dash

Code reference

References 

Encodings of Japanese
Typographical symbols
Punctuation